Dallman is a surname. Notable people with the surname include:

Kevin Dallman (born 1981), Canadian-Kazakhstani professional ice hockey defenceman
Marty Dallman (born 1963), Canadian former ice hockey player
Matthew Dallman (born 1985), American soccer player
Petra Dallman, also known as Petra Dallmann, (born 1978), German swimmer
Rod Dallman (born 1967), retired Canadian professional ice hockey left winger

See also

Dahlman (disambiguation)
Dailiman
Dalaman
Dallam (disambiguation)
Dallan (disambiguation)
Dalman
Dalmand
Dalmane
Dalmanites
Dalmasan
Dalmau
Dalyan
Daylaman
Delman
Dillman (disambiguation)
Dillmann
Dilman
Dollman (disambiguation)
Dolman
Tallman (disambiguation)
Talman (disambiguation)

de:Dallman